Savoj Bolagh (also Romanized as Sāvoj Bolāgh; also known as Sāvoj Bolāghī) is a village in Arshaq Sharqi Rural District, in the Central District of Ardabil County, Ardabil Province, Iran. At the 2006 census, its population was 261, in 54 families.

References 

Towns and villages in Ardabil County